The Tennessee Schools for the Deaf (TSD) is a state-operated residential and day school for deaf and hard-of-hearing students who reside in the state of Tennessee ranging from pre-kindergarten to grade 12 also includes a post-secondary transition/occupational program. It is located in Knoxville, Tennessee within the historic Island Home Park neighborhood.

History 
General John Alexander Cocke introduced legislation establishing Tennessee School for the Deaf that was passed by the House on January 29, 1844. Revered Thomas MacIntire who was a highly recommended teacher from what is now the Ohio School for the Deaf was selected to lead the school as principal and teacher. He opened the school on April 14, 1845, and the first students began class on the first Monday of June, 1845. When the first school for the Deaf was established in Tennessee in 1845, it was named Tennessee Asylum for the Deaf and Dumb. The original school location would be one-room school house with 6 students. The schoolhouse was first moved a few years after its founding to a larger tract of land near Broadway and Summit Hill Drive. After brief closure due to civil war, Tennessee Asylum for the Deaf and Dumb relocated to current location at Island Home and renamed itself. The school changed its name to Tennessee School for the Deaf in 1924.

Academics 
TSD offers several programs ranging from infants to post high school. Those programs include outreach, Parent(s) of Deaf Mentoring, Preschool, Elementary, Upper School (Middle and High School), Comprehensive Adult Program. The Parent(s) of Deaf Mentor program works closely with parents and their deaf or hard of hearing children from ages 0 to 3. When a student reaches 18 months of age, he or she can enroll at ISD as an official student. Preschool handles children up until Pre-Kindergarten. Elementary provides academics and activities for Kindergarten through 4th grade students. Middle school hosts grades 5 to 8, and High School hosts grades 9 through 12.

Athletics 
The Tennessee School for the Deaf is a part of the Tennessee Secondary School Athletic Association. It fields high school sports teams in football, volleyball, cheerleading, cross-country running, basketball, swimming, and track and field, which compete against public school teams as well as teams from other schools for the deaf. Cheerleading is also included in the athletic program.

Residency 

Since students come from all over the state of Tennessee, TSD is a residential school. The school system has cottages which act as dormitories. Children aged 3–21 are allowed, with specific limitations, to reside on campus.  Students arrive on Sundays and depart on Fridays. Cottages are for students who live far enough not to be able to travel by bus every day to school, typically those students who exceed 60-90 minute one way trip. There are cottages for male and female students: Preschool, Elementary, Middle School, and High School. TSD's residential programs offer extracurricular activities, peer interaction, student growth and development, achievement, and more. Current Student Life Director at Knoxville campus, Bethany VanBebber, oversees approximately 78 residential students aged from 6-20.

See also

 West Tennessee School for the Deaf
 Tennessee School for the Blind

References

External links

 
History of Tennessee School for the Deaf - 100 Years (1845-1945)

Schools for the deaf in the United States
Boarding schools in Tennessee
Schools in Knoxville, Tennessee
Educational institutions established in 1844
School buildings on the National Register of Historic Places in Tennessee
Historic districts on the National Register of Historic Places in Tennessee
National Register of Historic Places in Knoxville, Tennessee
1844 establishments in Tennessee
Public boarding schools in the United States
K-12 schools in Tennessee
Public high schools in Tennessee
Public middle schools in Tennessee
Public elementary schools in Tennessee
Public K-12 schools in the United States